John Shuguto Kitolano (born 18 October 1999) is a Norwegian professional footballer who plays as defender for Eliteserien club Aalesund.

Club career
On 9 August 2018, Kitolano moved to Wolverhampton Wanderers for an undisclosed fee.

On 20 January 2020, Kitolano joined Molde on loan until the end of the 2021 season.

International career
Kitolano has played a total of 37 games for Norway at international youth level.

Personal life
Kitolano, who has seven siblings, came to Norway from DR Congo in October 2005. Kitolano's younger brother Joshua plays for Sparta Rotterdam, whilst older brother Eric plays for Molde.

Career statistics

References

1999 births
Living people
Sportspeople from Skien
Norwegian footballers
Norway youth international footballers
Association football defenders
Odds BK players
Wolverhampton Wanderers F.C. players
Molde FK players
Eliteserien players
Norwegian expatriate footballers
Expatriate footballers in England
Norwegian expatriate sportspeople in England
Democratic Republic of the Congo emigrants to Norway